Christer Johansson may refer to:

Christer Johansson (poker player) (born 1970), Swedish professional sports bettor and poker player
Christer Johansson (skier) (born 1950), former Swedish cross country skier
Christer Johansson (table tennis), Swedish table tennis player